First Methodist Church of Columbia is a historic Methodist church located at 501 Church Street in Columbia, Louisiana.  It was built in 1911 and enlarged in 1939.

The church features Bungalow/Craftsman, Gothic, and Romanesque architectural elements, and the building was added to the National Register of Historic Places in 1982.

See also 
National Register of Historic Places listings in Caldwell Parish, Louisiana

References

National Register of Historic Places in Louisiana
Gothic Revival architecture in Louisiana
Romanesque Revival architecture in Louisiana
Churches completed in 1911
Caldwell Parish, Louisiana